Lac-du-Cerf is a municipality in the Laurentides region of Quebec, Canada, part of the Antoine-Labelle Regional County Municipality. It is located on and named after Lac du Cerf (Deer Lake).

The main economic activities are agriculture, forestry, and tourism.

History
At the beginning of the 20th century, the area was still only visited by trappers and log drivers. In 1915 the first 2 settler families arrived and built their homes on the north shore of Petit Lac-du-Cerf (Little Deer Lake). They were followed by more settlers in 1918. In 1919, two bridges were built over the Lièvre River at Île Longue (Long Island), connecting the new settlement to Notre-Dame-de-Pontmain by road.

The place continued to attract more settlers throughout the 1920s and 30s. In 1939, its post office opened (which closed in 1970).

In January 1955, the Municipality of Lac-du-Cerf was created out of territory ceded from Saint-Aimé-du-Lac-des-Îles and Notre-Dame-de-Pontmain. Its first mayor was Joseph Boismenu, who in 1918, at 22 years of age, moved to Lac-du-Cerf together with his wife.

Demographics

Private dwellings occupied by usual residents: 245 (total dwellings: 458)

Mother tongue:
 English as first language: 5%
 French as first language: 95%
 English and French as first language: 0%
 Other as first language: 0%

Local government

List of former mayors:
 Joseph Boismenu (1955–1956, 1959–1960)
 Patrice Bondu (1956–1958)
 Gerald Ouimet (1961–1962)
 Henri Filion (1963–1964)
 Gerard Boismenu (1965–1971)
 Raymond Charbonneau (1971–1973)
 Mario Bondu (1973–...)
 Denis Simard (...–2009)
 Pauline Ouimet (2009–2013)
 Danielle Ouimet (2013–2021)
 Nicolas Pentassuglia (2021–present)

See also
List of municipalities in Quebec

References

External links

Incorporated places in Laurentides
Municipalities in Quebec